Toni Maree Jeffs (born 3 December 1968 in Auckland) is a former freestyle swimmer from New Zealand, who competed for her native country at the 1992 Summer Olympics. There she finished 27th equal in the 50m Freestyle. In the same event Jeffs twice won a bronze medal at the Commonwealth Games: in 1998 and in 2002.

References

1968 births
Living people
Olympic swimmers of New Zealand
People educated at Whakatane High School
Sportspeople from Whakatāne
New Zealand female freestyle swimmers
Swimmers at the 1992 Summer Olympics
Swimmers from Auckland
New Zealand female swimmers
Commonwealth Games bronze medallists for New Zealand
Swimmers at the 1998 Commonwealth Games
Swimmers at the 2002 Commonwealth Games
Commonwealth Games medallists in swimming
Medallists at the 1998 Commonwealth Games
Medallists at the 2002 Commonwealth Games